Colegio Pestalozzi (also the Colegio Suizo del Perú or ) is a Swiss international school in Miraflores District, Lima, Peru. It serves levels Vorkindergarten (preschool) through Sekundarstufe II (senior high school).

The school first opened in 1943 on leased property at Zela 205, San Isidro, Bosque El Olivar. The school was supposed to open in 1942 but the late arrival of the school's Swiss teacher, Dr. Conrad Huber, hampered by World War II, caused the opening to be delayed.

It was named after Johann Heinrich Pestalozzi.

References

External links
  Colegio Pestalozzi

International schools in Lima
Swiss international schools
1943 establishments in Peru
Educational institutions established in 1943